Laskin is a surname, and may refer to:
 Bora Laskin, PC, CC, FRSC (1912–1984), a Canadian jurist, served on the Supreme Court of Canada
 The Laskin Moot, a Canadian moot court competition named in honour of Bora Laskin
 Daniel Laskin (1924–2021), an American oral and maxillofacial surgeon and educator
 John I. Laskin, judge of the Ontario Court of Appeal in Canada
Julia Laskin, Russian-American chemist
 Larissa Laskin, an American television actress
 Saul Laskin (1918–2008), a Canadian politician
 William Laskin, a Canadian luthier, musician and guitar maker